Montréal–Trudeau International Airport  or Montréal–Trudeau, formerly known and still commonly referred to as Montréal–Dorval International Airport (Aéroport international Montréal-Dorval), is an international airport in Dorval, Quebec, Canada. The airport terminals are located entirely in the suburb of Dorval, while one runway is located in the Montreal borough of Saint-Laurent. Air Canada, the country's flag carrier, also has its corporate headquarters complex on the Saint-Laurent side of the airport. It also serves Greater Montreal and adjacent regions in Quebec and eastern Ontario, as well as the states of Vermont and northern New York in the United States. The airport is named in honour of Pierre Elliott Trudeau, the 15th Prime Minister of Canada and father of current Prime Minister Justin Trudeau.

The airport is one of two managed and operated by Aéroports de Montréal (ADM), a not-for-profit corporation without share capital; the other is Montréal–Mirabel northwest of Montreal, which was initially intended to replace the one in Dorval but now deals almost solely with cargo. Montréal–Trudeau is owned by Transport Canada which has a 60-year lease with Aéroports de Montréal, as per Canada's National Airport Policy of 1994.

Trudeau is the busiest airport in the province of Quebec and the third-busiest airport in Canada by passenger traffic, with 15.9 million passengers in 2022. It is one of eight Canadian airports with United States border preclearance and is one of the main gateways into Canada with 13.1 million or 65% of its passengers being on non-domestic flights, the highest proportion amongst Canada's airports during 2018. It is one of four Air Canada hubs and, in that capacity, serves mainly Quebec, the Atlantic Provinces and Eastern Ontario. On an average day, 53,000 passengers transit through Montréal-Trudeau.

Airlines servicing Trudeau offer year-round non-stop flights to five continents, namely Africa, Asia, Europe, North and South America. It is one of only two airports in Canada with non-stop flights to five continents, the other being Toronto Pearson International Airport. Trudeau airport is the headquarters of and a large hub for Air Canada, the country's largest airline. It is also the headquarters of Air Inuit and Air Transat, and an operation base for Sunwing Airlines and Porter Airlines. It also plays a role in general aviation as home to the headquarters of Innotech-Execair, Starlink, ACASS and Maintenance Repair & Overhaul (MRO) facilities of Air Transat and Air Inuit. Transport Canada operates a Civil Aviation Maintenance, Repair and Overhaul facility on site, with a fleet of Government owned and operated civil aircraft. Bombardier Aerospace has an assembly facility on site where they build Global and Challenger business jets.

History

Early years
By the 1940s, it was increasingly clear that Montreal's original airport, Saint-Hubert Airport, in operation since 1927, was no longer adequate for the city's needs. The Minister of Transport purchased land at the Dorval Race Track, which was considered the best location for an enlarged airport because of its good weather conditions and few foggy days. The airport opened on September 1, 1941, as Dorval Airport/Aéroport Dorval with three paved runways. By 1946 the airport was hosting more than a quarter of a million passengers a year, growing to more than a million in the mid-1950s. During World War II thousands of Allied aircraft passed through Dorval on the way to England. At one time Dorval was the major transatlantic hub for commercial aviation and the busiest airport in Canada, with flights from airlines such as British Overseas Airways Corporation (BOAC).
Until 1959, it also doubled as RCAF Station Lachine.
Airport diagram for 1954

Growth

In November 1960 the airport was renamed Montreal–Dorval International Airport/Aéroport international Dorval de Montréal. On December 15 of that year the Minister of Transport inaugurated a new $30 million terminal. The structure was built by Illsley, Templeton, Archibald, and Larose. At its height, it was the largest terminal in Canada and one of the biggest in the world. It was the gateway to Canada for all European air traffic and served more than two million passengers per year. Eight years later, Montréal–Dorval International Airport underwent a major expansion program. Despite this, the government of Prime Minister of Canada Pierre Elliott Trudeau (who represented a Montreal riding) predicted that Dorval would be completely saturated by 1985 and also projected that 20 million passengers would be passing through Montreal's airports annually. They decided to construct a new airport in Sainte-Scholastique, what became Montréal–Mirabel International Airport. As the first phase in the transition that would eventually have seen Dorval closed, all international flights (except those to and from the United States) were to be transferred to the new airport in 1975.

The opening and closing of Mirabel Airport

On November 29, 1975, Mirabel International Airport went into service. Many connecting flights to Canadian centres were transferred to Mirabel and 23 international airlines moved their overseas activities there. As a consequence, Montréal–Dorval was repurposed to serve domestic flights and transborder flights to the United States. Mirabel's traffic decreased due to the advent in the 1980s of longer-range jets that did not need to refuel in Montreal before crossing the Atlantic Ocean. Montreal's economic decline in the late 1970s and 1980s had a significant effect on the airport's traffic, as international flights bypassed Montreal altogether in favour of Toronto Pearson International Airport. The Trudeau government had developed Mirabel Airport to handle an expected growth in international traffic and eventually, to replace Dorval. However, the extra traffic never materialized. In May 2007, it was reported that the International Centre of Advanced Racing had signed a 25-year lease with Aéroports de Montréal to use part of the airport as a racetrack, the Circuit ICAR. At the same time the fixed-base operator Hélibellule opened a facility there which caters to private planes. The company also provides a helicopter passenger service from Mirabel to destinations in Canada and the United States. They operate two different types of helicopters: the Bell 222 and the Aérospatiale Gazelle.

Back to Montréal–Dorval, renaissance

With all international scheduled flights returning to Montréal–Dorval in 1997, as well as charter flights in 2004, Montréal–Dorval International Airport finally became a true hub as passengers would no longer have to travel to different airports depending on the destination of their flight. The consolidation of flights to Montréal–Dorval resulted in an increase in passenger traffic, not only due to the transfer of flights but because it became easier to connect through Montreal.

Starting as Dorval Airport, then Montréal–Dorval International Airport, the airport was renamed Montréal–Pierre Elliott Trudeau International Airport in Trudeau's honour on January 1, 2004, by the federal government. The renaming had been announced in September 2003 by then Minister of Transport David Collenette. This move provoked some opposition, especially Quebec sovereigntists opposed to Trudeau's staunchly federalist policies. The renaming also provoked opposition from many aviation historians and enthusiasts who recalled Trudeau's role in the effort to shutter Dorval in favour of the much larger and modern Mirabel Airport, of which he was the greatest instigator of its construction. Many Montrealers still refer to Trudeau airport as "Dorval," or "Dorval Airport."

Operation Yellow Ribbon
After the September 11 attacks, Dorval Airport participated in Operation Yellow Ribbon, taking in seven diverted flights that had been bound for the closed airspace over the United States, even though pilots were asked to avoid the airport as a security measure . Mirabel International Airport also took in 10 other diverted flights totaling 17 diverted flight in the Montreal area bound for American cities.

75th anniversary
In 2016, Montréal-Trudeau celebrated its 75th anniversary. Under the theme Service, Destinations, Passion since 1941, various activities and contests were planned throughout the year. In partnership with the Canada Aviation and Space Museum, the airport hosted the Travelling Through Time exhibition in the public hall of the US Departures area. Exhibits showcasing important milestones in the airport's history were incorporated throughout the terminal.

Expansion

Terminal expansion (2000–2007)

 
Montréal–Trudeau underwent a major expansion and modernization designed to increase the terminal's capacity and substantially enhance the level of passenger service. In February 2000, with a budget of CAD716 million, ADM announced plans for an extensive expansion plan that would bring Montréal–Trudeau up to standard with other North American airports its size. The airport terminal had for the most part remained the same, with the exception of minor renovations, since its opening in 1960. With increased passenger volume resulting from the transfer of international scheduled passengers from Mirabel Airport in 1997, as well as Air Canada's intentions to make Montréal–Trudeau its Eastern Canada hub, there was a strong need to greatly expand the terminal, whose capacity of roughly 7 million passengers per year had been exceeded.

The expansion program included the construction of several brand-new facilities, including a jetty for flights to the United States (US Preclearance Terminal), another for other international destinations (International Terminal) and a huge international arrivals complex. An 18-gate Transborder Concourse opened in 2003, an 11-gate International Concourse opened in 2004, new customs hall and baggage claim area for non-domestic flights and an expanded parking garage opened in 2005. Additionally, sections of the domestic area were renovated and expanded in 2007, accompanied with additional retail space. The International part of the Aeroquay satellite was demolished in 2008, leaving the domestic part for regional carriers. The completion of the CAD716 million expansion gives Montréal–Trudeau the ability to serve 15 million passengers a year. This ironically accomplished one of the goals that was to be met with the construction of Mirabel. (In the 1970s, the federal government projected that 20 million passengers would be passing through Montreal's airports annually by 1985, with 17 million through Mirabel). Aéroports de Montréal financed all of these improvements itself, with no government grants. By the end of 2007, CAD1.5 billion had been spent to upgrade Montréal–Trudeau.

The last round of construction in this phase was to allow the airport to accommodate the Airbus A380. Gate 55, part of the international jetty, was designed for the requirements of the A380. It is equipped with two air bridges to load and unload passengers on both decks of the A380 simultaneously. With Phase II of the international jetty expansion now completed, the airport has two additional A380 gates, although there are currently no airlines operating this type of aircraft at the airport.

Air France became the first operator of the type in Montreal on April 22, 2011, when they officially launched their daily A380 service from Paris. A380 service was reduced to 4 weekly flights during summer 2012 and withdrawn in October 2012, due to low demand for business class and a high level of competition, with Air Canada, Air Transat and Corsair also operating Montreal–Paris flights.

New hotel, transborder terminal expansion and modernization (2006–2009)

On June 15, 2006, construction began on a new four-star Marriott hotel at the airport, above the transborder terminal. Originally scheduled to be completed by September 2008, the 279 first-class room hotel opened its doors on August 19, 2009. Construction was slowed down because of the recession and a collapse in the Transborder market. It contains an underground train station that was planned to eventually connect the airport with downtown Montreal as well as ADM's corporate headquarters.

On the same day, Montreal–Trudeau airport opened the doors to the refurbished, expanded, modernized and user-friendly transborder terminal, meeting the industry's highest standards. Furthermore, the terminal is equipped with a new baggage sorting room which allows U.S. customs officers to retrieve luggage for secondary inspection.

International terminal expansion (2011–2016)

In July 2011, James Cherry, the CEO of Aéroports de Montréal, announced the construction of a two-phase expansion of Montréal–Trudeau's international terminal. The total cost of the project, now completed, has been around $620 million.

Phase I of this project, which was completed on December 20, 2012, opened a new boarding lounge which can accommodate as many as 420 passengers, along with a new gate, numbered 62. It was officially completed at a cost of $270 million. The new gate can accommodate three Passenger Transfer Vehicles, allowing passengers to be transferred from the terminal to an aircraft parked on a remote stand nearby. When phase II of the expansion began in 2014, this gate was closed to passengers. It was reopened with the inauguration of the extension two years later.

Phase II of the project, which was officially inaugurated on May 10, 2016, and put into service two days after, added six new contact gates for wide-body jets, including two for the Airbus A380, increasing the total number of contact gates from 10 to 16. This expansion holds gates 63 through 68. The area has 20,000 m2 of open spaces, restaurants, shops and a children's playground area. It took two years to complete and opened four months ahead of the original schedule for a total cost of $350 million. It was conceived by Humà Design and integrates three massive art installations and four vitrines showcasing Montreal's museums. The extension of the international jetty was built to alleviate the high level of congestion on the tarmac and in the terminal.

Apart from these expansions, ADM inaugurated in April 2016, a commercial area between gate 52 and 53. This area is called Haltes gourmandes (English: gourmet stops) referring to the large number of restaurants located there. The new restaurants are all owned by SSP Canada Food Service Inc. They operate 12 locations in the terminal, managing a total of 4000 m2 of terminal area. SSP invested over $200 million throughout 2016 in its airport locations.

Future projects (2018–2030)
In January 2016, ADM published a call for tenders on their website regarding the restoration and upgrade of the curtain wall of the main façade on the terminal. This part of the airport is one of the oldest remaining parts of the original terminal.

Also, according to the 2013–2033 master plan from ADM, the following future developments are in the works:

Increase in the capacity of the passenger curb-side areas
Development of a network of taxiways in the centre-west portion of the airport to support the development of a new air cargo handling area and an industrial development zone
Reconfiguration of the international arrivals hall and of the domestic and international departures luggage room
Extension of the transborder jetty and addition of a remote parking area

On April 30, 2018, a massive new expansion project was unveiled that will last until 2030. The first phase ($2.5 billion) will see the airport's multi-level parking lot demolished and rebuilt with a green roof and the Montreal-Trudeau Airport REM station underneath. The drop-off area will be greatly expanded and covered with glass, and a new remote terminal will be built where runway 10/28 used to stand. By 2030, the remote terminal will be connected via future phases to the current terminal building to handle the expected growth. ADM CEO Philippe Rainville stated "the airport's growth has been about double the international average in recent years [so the] goal is to meet the growth projections of the airport."

Infrastructure

Runways

There are currently three runways in operation at Montréal-Trudeau, two parallel runways aligned in a northeast–southwest direction and a single runway in an east–west direction.

Terminal

Montréal-Trudeau airport consists of one two-storied terminal, divided into four different zones: the public area (departures and arrivals level), the domestic jetty, the international jetty and the transborder jetty. There are two distinct areas in the public part of the airport (departure level); one is dedicated for the check-in of flights within or outside Canada (except U.S.) and the other one is for flights departing for the U.S. Both public areas are equipped with self-service check-in kiosks, a prayer area, shops and cafés. There is free Wi-Fi throughout the airport, luggage trolleys, ATMs and nursing rooms. When passengers arrive at Montréal-Trudeau from an international destination, they are welcomed into a huge and bright arrival complex, before passing through primary customs inspection, then go down one level to the baggage claim area and finally the international arrivals public area. The Aérogalerie program places artworks throughout the airport to showcase the city's artistic and cultural history. Works throughout the airport include showcases, illuminated columns, temporary exhibitions in the international arrival complex and permanent collection from various artists from the city.

The domestic jetty, which is accessible via security checkpoint A, is divided into two parts: a satellite jetty connected by a tunnel to the main terminal and a wing attached to the main terminal building. The main jetty holds 16 gates: 1 through 12, 15, and 47 through 49. The satellite jetty holds another 10 gates: 17, 19, 21, 23, 25, 27, 28, 30, 32 and 34. There are only two boarding bridges located inside the satellite (17 and 21) as the other gates are mostly used for prop aircraft like the Bombardier Dash 8 family. These parts of the airport are the only departure areas remaining that were part of the original terminal.

The International jetty, also accessible via the security checkpoint A, is dedicated to flights with destinations outside Canada and United States. This jetty holds 18 gates: 50 through 53 and 55 through 68. Gates 53 and 62 are used exclusively for Passenger Transfer Vehicles. In this area, travellers can shop, eat and relax with a wide varieties of boutiques, restaurants, cafés, spa facilities and one of the biggest airport duty-free shops in Canada. At the far end of the jetty, there is a wide open space with a lot of natural lights through floor to ceilings windows and a big skylight in the rooftop. The masterpiece of the jetty is a work of art, called Veil of Glass, composed of different coloured glass triangles illuminated by spotlights, created by local artist ATOMIC3. Several murals and other works of art are also located in this jetty, including four from various Montréal museums.

In the international jetty, there is a large area where passengers can relax before their flight. Travelers are able to download to their smartphone or e-reader the first chapter of any books available on the platform Lire vous transporte. After that, they can choose to buy the entire book through the Wi-Fi network in the airport. A rest area has been constructed near gate 57 in order to read these books in a calm environment, with cushions and dimmed lights. There are over 1000 chairs with charging stations and USB ports throughout the jetty as well as three water bottle-filling stations.

Lastly, there is a jetty dedicated to all U.S. bound flights, which holds 18 gates: 72 through 89. For access to gate 87, 88 or 89, passengers must go down one level via an escalator. Gate 56, 58 and 60 (part of the international jetty) can also be used for a U.S. bound flight. They can be isolated from the other gates by moving glass walls known as swing gates. Unlike other jetties, the transborder jetty requires passengers to go through security checkpoint C and then the U.S. Customs and Border Protection and lastly through the duty-free shop before accessing their gates. The gate area contains the same services as the other parts of the airport such as shops, restaurants, rest zones and cafés. If needed, some gates can be isolated in order to offer additional security checkpoints if an aircraft flies to a potential risk zone like Washington–National.

Airport lounges
Two major airline alliances (Star Alliance and SkyTeam) have a large presence at Montréal-Trudeau, and therefore both maintain frequent flyer lounges within the airport. There are also two "Pay-In" lounges open for use by all passengers, regardless of airline, frequent flyer status or class of travel.

Air Canada Maple Leaf Lounge (Star Alliance)
Domestic
International
USA Transborder
Air France/KLM Lounge (SkyTeam)
National Bank Lounge
Desjardins Odyssey Lounge

Airlines and destinations

Passenger

Cargo

Statistics

Annual traffic

: At Montréal–Trudeau and at other airports in Canada with United States border preclearance, a distinction is made between "transborder" and "international" flights for operational and statistical purposes. A "transborder" flight is a flight between Canada and a destination in the United States, while an "international" flight is a flight between Canada and a destination that is not within the United States or Canada. A "domestic" flight is a flight within Canada only.

: During 2020 & 2021, there was a significant decrease of passenger numbers due to the COVID-19 global pandemic and Canada border closures and/or restrictions.

Ground transportation

Public transport
The Société de transport de Montréal (STM) currently has four regular bus routes serving Trudeau International Airport, including routes "204 Cardinal" and "209 Sources" which run every day and routes "356 Lachine /Montreal–Trudeau /Des Sources" and "378 Sauvé /Côte-Vertu /Montreal–Trudeau" which are night buses. Three of the four routes can take passengers to and from the Dorval bus terminus and train station, within walking distance of Via's Dorval station. A shuttle bus also runs between the airport and Via's Dorval station.

On March 29, 2010, the STM introduced the 747 Montreal-Trudeau/Downtown route. Operating 7 days a week, 24 hours a day and 365 days a year, this route connects the airport to eight downtown stops, including transfer stops at Lionel-Groulx metro station, Central Station and Berri-UQAM metro station.

Prior to the introduction of this public transportation service, Groupe La Québécoise operated a coach service known as L'Aerobus between the airport and Central Station, connecting with several hotels downtown.

Inter-city rail connections

It is the nearest station on the Québec City-Windsor Corridor and offers inter-city rail connections to Quebec City, Ottawa, Kingston and Toronto as well as a smaller regional centres in Quebec and Ontario. (Public transport options to downtown Montreal available from the STM are more frequent, and Via does not provide service between Dorval and Montreal Central Station on some trains.)

The shuttle bus from Montréal–Trudeau International Airport to Dorval station is free of charge to Via Rail passengers, departs every 20–30 minutes from door 8 on the departures level of the airport and takes around 20 minutes of travel time.

Private bus
KLM Royal Dutch Airlines operates a bus from Trudeau Airport to Ottawa Railway Station only for Air France-KLM customers originating in/arriving in the Ottawa area.  Air-France KLM has three daily bus services between those cities.

Air France also operates a bus from Trudeau to Sainte-Foy in Quebec City for its customers.

Swiss International Air Lines previously operated its Swissbus service from Trudeau to Ottawa Railway Station for Swiss customers.

Car
The airport is accessible from Highway 20 or from Highway 520, a spur off Highway 40 that leads directly towards the airport. Eastbound Highway 20 leads to the Dorval interchange, the exit which drivers must take for the airport. From the north, Côte-Vertu Boulevard that runs parallel to runways 24L and 24R provides access to the Air Canada Base and hangars, Air Transat hangars, Air Inuit hangars, Bombardier Aerospace assembly facility and the deicing facility.

When drivers pick up or drop off guests at Trudeau, they are permitted to stop momentarily outside the Arrivals and Departure areas at both the Canada and International departures as well as the Transborder Jetty.

Aéroports de Montréal, the City of Montreal, Transports Québec and Transport Canada made plans to improve the Dorval interchange and built direct road links between the airport and highways 20 and 520. Once the certificate of authorization was obtained, work began in June 2009 with an original projected end date of 2017, although some parts of the project will be on hold for several years. The project entails redesigning the road network within the airport site, which was mostly completed as planned.

Future connections
On April 22, 2016, the CEO of the Caisse de Dépot et de Placement du Québec Michael Sabia and Montreal mayor Denis Coderre announced a massive transit project called Réseau express métropolitain, slated to open between 2023 and 2027. This planned rapid transit network will connect the Trudeau Airport to the Central station in Downtown Montréal, the North Shore, the South Shore and the West Island. It will run from 5am to 1am, 7 days a week. Construction began in April 2018 and will connect Trudeau Airport with downtown by 2027.

Incidents and accidents

 November 29, 1963 – Trans-Canada Air Lines Flight 831 crashed shortly after departure for Toronto International Airport, killing all 118 people on board the Douglas DC-8 jet.
On June 18, 1998, Propair Flight 420 suffered from brake dragging on departure from Trudeau Airport (then known as Montreal Dorval Airport). This heated up the wheel brakes of the Fairchild Metroliner, which eventually became lit by hydraulic fluid, starting a fire in the left wing. The aircraft attempted to divert to Mirabel International Airport. However, the left wing suffered a structural failure due to the extreme flames, and the aircraft rolled and hit the ground upside down, killing all 11 people on the flight.
 June 5, 2015 – WestJet flight 588 from Toronto Pearson International Airport, operated by a Boeing 737-600 (Registration C GWCT) slid off the runway while landing. There were no fatalities or injuries among the passengers and crew.

Tenants

Jet Fuel A, A-1 and 100DLL are available from various FBOs at Dorval.

References

External links

 
 
 Virtual tour of the airport (video) – Aéroports de Montréal
 Arriving at Montréal–Trudeau airport: from the gate to the exit (video) – Aéroports de Montréal

 STM system maps

Certified airports in Quebec
Transport in Montreal
Canadian airports with United States border preclearance
Airports established in 1941
1941 establishments in Quebec
Buildings and structures in Dorval
Buildings and structures in Montreal
Transport in Dorval
Saint-Laurent, Quebec
National Airports System